Allygidius is a genus of true bugs belonging to the family Cicadellidae.

The species of this genus are found in Europe and Northern America.

Species:
 Allygidius abbreviatus Lethierry, 1878 
 Allygidius alanensis Gnezdilov, 1997

References

Cicadellidae
Hemiptera genera